Chen Xinyu (born 24 November 1993), also known by her stage name Maggie Chen, is a Chinese actress. She made her acting debut in the TV drama The Master of the House (2013), and has since gone on to appear in numerous drama titles such as Prince of Lan Ling (2013), The Imperial Doctress (2016) and Ice Fantasy (2016).

Early life
Born in Shanghai on 1993, Chen has been keen on literary and artistic activities since childhood. She attended and graduated from Shanghai Institute of Visual Art.

Career
In 2013, she made her television debut in the TV drama Prince of Lan Ling. In 2014, she co-starred with Yao Qianyu and Zhai Tianlin in the drama The Master of the House, which was set in the era of Republic of China.

In 2015, she co-starred with Wallace Chung and Tang Yan in the drama My Sunshine, which was premiered on Jiangsu Satellite TV and Dragon TV. In the same year, she starred in the drama Secrets of Women, where she played Gao Fei, a magazine editor who lacks self-confidence.

In July 2016, she joined the cast of the TV series Ice Fantasy, where she played the role of Chao Ya, the Queen of the Spiritual Tribe. In the same month, she played the role of Zheng Xiaotong in the film Never Gone. It was her first appearance in big screen. In March 2017, she joined the cast of TV series Ice Fantasy Destiny, the sequel of Ice Fantasy, where he played Yang Da, the reincarnation of Chao Ya and in October of the same year, she joined the recurring cast of the series Rule the World, where she played the role of Lady Abahai, the niece of Bujantai and fourth primary consort of Nurhaci. In 2018, she joined the recurring cast of the series Summer's Desire.

In February 2019, she was cast in the TV drama Heavenly Sword and Dragon Slaying Saber, where she played the role of Yin Susu. On May 27 of the same year, she starred alongside Miao Miao in the TV drama Unstoppable Youth, until the series' finale on 2 January 2020.

In 2020, Chen joined the cast of the series My Talent Neighbor, where she played the role of Song Yiwen. In 2021, she starred alongside Chen Xingxu and Zhang Jingyi in the TV drama Fall in Love, which was broadcast in Youku.

Filmography
Source:

Film

Television

Variety shows

References

External links
 
  

1993 births
Living people
Actresses from Shanghai
Chinese film actresses
Chinese television actresses
21st-century Chinese actresses